Nicholas Fung (born 18 May 1990) is a Malaysian professional golfer.

Asian Development Tour
Fung won the Order of Merit (money title) on the 2013 Asian Development Tour (ADT). He won ADT events in 2013, 2015 and 2017.

Asian Tour
Fung has competed for multiple seasons on the Asian Tour. He captured his maiden title at the 2017 Queen's Cup, claiming a one-stroke victory over Jazz Janewattananond of Thailand. He also has three runner-up finishes – a tie for second at the 2013 Indonesia Open, a solo second at the 2015 World Classic Championship, and a tie for second at the 2016 Resorts World Manila Masters.

International competition
Fung competed at the 2014 EurAsia Cup, the 2016 EurAsia Cup, and the 2016 World Cup of Golf.

Amateur wins
2006 Brunei Amateur
2007 Vietnam Amateur, Kelantan Amateur

Professional wins (13)

Asian Tour wins (1)

Asian Tour playoff record (0–1)

Asian Development Tour wins (3)

1Co-sanctioned by the Professional Golf of Malaysia Tour

ASEAN PGA Tour wins (2)

Other wins (7)
2011 PGM Sabah Classic, PGM Sarawak Classic
2012 PGM Negeri Sembilan Classic, PGM UMW Glenmarie Classic
2013 I&P Group Championship
2014 Kelantan Closed Championship
2015 PGM Nilais Spring Closed Championship

Team appearances
Professional
World Cup (representing Malaysia): 2016
EurAsia Cup (representing Asia): 2014 (tie), 2016, 2018

References

External links

Malaysian male golfers
Asian Tour golfers
1990 births
Living people